Richard Anthony Johnson  (born 11 May 1946, in Sydney) is an Australian architect best known as the creator of some of the Australian most important and iconic cultural buildings and spaces of the twentieth century.

Academic career
Johnson graduated in 1969 with first class honours in Architecture from the University of New South Wales and a Master of Philosophy in Town Planning from the University College London in 1977.  He has held several academic positions including Adjunct Professor of Architecture, at the University of NSW between 1999 and 2008; and a Professor of Practice/Architectural Studies, at the University of NSW since 2008.

Professional associations include appointment as a Life Fellow of the Royal Australian Institute of Architects in 2011; a Fellow of the Royal Australian Institute of Architects in 2005; an Associate of the Design Institute of Australia; an Associate of the Japan Institute of Architects; and a Registered Architect in the State of New South Wales.

Professional experience
1969 – 1985 Principal Architect, Department of Housing and Construction
1985 – 2000 Director, Denton Corker Marshall Pty Ltd
In 2001, the Sydney-based Directors of DCM, Richard Johnson, Adrian Pilton and Jeff Walker de-merged the Sydney office from the group and renamed the office Johnson Pilton Walker Pty Ltd – a multi-design disciplinary firm which is currently working on a wide range of projects in Australia, China and New Zealand. Kiong Lee, Paul van Ratingen and Graeme Dix joined the practice as Directors. 
2000 – present Director, Johnson Pilton Walker Pty Ltd.

Projects

Some of Johnson's major projects have included:.
Australian Pavilion – Expo '74 in Spokane (USA)
– as assistant to James Maccormick. 
Australian Pavilion – Expo '75 in Okinawa (Japan)
Australian Pavilion – Expo '85 in Tsukuba (Japan)
Australia Post Pavilion and Exhibits at Expo 88 (Brisbane)
Queensland News Pavilion and Exhibits – Expo 88 (Brisbane)
Spanish Pavilion and Exhibits – Expo 88 (Brisbane)
Australian Embassy in Beijing,
masterplan of the Australian Embassy in Tokyo
Art Gallery of NSW – New Asian Gallery
Sydney Opera House masterplan and refurbishments (with Jørn Utzon)
Museum of Sydney, 1995
First Government House Place, Sydney
Australian Museum – New Zoology Building
Australian National Maritime Museum – Masterplan
National Portrait Gallery in Canberra
Tasmanian Museum and Art Gallery in Hobart – Masterplan
National Gallery of Victoria – Redevelopment Masterplan and Feasibility Study

Awards
Johnson was appointed Member of the Order of the British Empire (MBE) in 1976 for Public Service in the field of architecture and in 2012 was appointed Life Governor of the Art Gallery of New South Wales.
 
In 2014 Johnson was appointed an Officer of the Order of Australia (AO) "for distinguished service to architecture, particularly the design of iconic Australian public buildings, to the visual arts and the museum and galleries sector, and to professional associations."

RAIA Gold Medal
Richard Johnson was awarded the RAIA Gold Medal by the Royal Australian Institute of Architects on 13 March 2008. The RAIA National President Alec Tzannes said the medal recognised Johnson’s "executed work of exceptional merit, and his outstanding contribution to the development of the profession in Australia".

References

External links
Johnson Pilton Walker official webpage

1946 births
Living people
University of New South Wales alumni
Alumni of University College London
New South Wales architects
Officers of the Order of Australia
Members of the Order of the British Empire
Recipients of the Royal Australian Institute of Architects’ Gold Medal
Architects from Sydney